Mézard is a French surname. Notable people with the surname include:

Ariane Mézard, French mathematician
Jacques Mézard (born 1947), French politician
Jean Mézard (1904-1997), French politician
Marc Mézard (born 1957), French physicist

French-language surnames